Patani Football Club, is a defunct Armenian football club from the capital Yerevan. They were consisted of the Armenia national under-17 football team and participated in the 2006, 2007 and 2008 Armenian First League seasons. They were dissolved in 2008.

References

Defunct football clubs in Armenia
Association football clubs established in 2006
Association football clubs disestablished in 2008
2006 establishments in Armenia
2008 disestablishments in Armenia